Tim McGill (born June 24, 1979) is an American football defensive tackle who is currently a  retired . He was signed by the Carolina Cobras as an undrafted free agent in 2003. He played college football at Illinois.

McGill has also been a member of the New York Dragons, New York Jets, Miami Dolphins, Green Bay Packers, Tampa Bay Storm, and Montreal Alouettes.

Early life
McGill attended Lake View High School in Chicago, Illinois. As a member of the football team, McGill played both running back and defensive line. He also participated in track & field as a discus thrower.

College career
On February 8, 1998, McGill accepted a football scholarship to Illinois to play fullback, drawing comparisons to Byron Morris.

Professional career
In 2003, McGill was a member of the Carolina Cobras before being traded to the New York Dragons for Matt Nagy. He was selected with the 3rd pick by the Utah Blaze during the 2005 expansion draft, but never played with the Blaze because he was trying to make the Packers roster. On October 11, 2006, McGill's rights were traded to the Nashville Kats, along with Thal Woods, for Frank Carter. Before the season started McGill was traded to the Storm for Demetrius Bendross.

References

External links
Montreal Alouettes bio

1979 births
Living people
Players of American football from Chicago
American football defensive tackles
Illinois Fighting Illini football players
Carolina Cobras players
New York Dragons players
New York Jets players
Hamburg Sea Devils players
Miami Dolphins players
Green Bay Packers players
Utah Blaze players
Nashville Kats players
Tampa Bay Storm players
New Orleans Saints players
Montreal Alouettes players
San Jose SaberCats players
San Antonio Talons players
Colorado Crush (IFL) players